Yanfeng District is an urban district of Hengyang City, Hunan province, China. The district is located in the middle south of the city proper and on the western bank of the Xiang River, it is bordered by Zhuhui District to the east, Hengnan County to the south, Zhengxiang District to the west, Shigu District to the north. The district has six subdistricts and a township under its jurisdiction.

History
According to legend, "wild geese fly from north to south, stop in the Mount Huiyanfeng to rest", the district was named after the mountain. The district of Yanfeng is historically a part of Hengyang County. On Jan 1 1942, the provincial city of Hengyang was separated from the urban area and region around the county seat of Hengyang County.

The district of Yanfeng was established on April 4, 2001. In the adjustment of urban subdivisions in Hengyang, Yanfeng District administers five subdistricts of Yanfeng, Baishazhou, Huangchaling, Tianmashan and Xianfenglu in the former Chengnan District, Xiangjiang Township (湘江乡; of which, Yangliu Village was transferred to Zhengxiang District) and Yuepin Township (岳屏乡; of which, three villages of Lianhe, Yuepin and Beitang were transferred to Zhengxiang District) in the former Jiaoqu (Suburb District),  and Wenchang Township of Hengyang County.

Administrative divisions 
6 subdistricts
 Baishazhou
 Huangchaling
 Jinlongping
 Tianmashan
 Xianfeng
 Yanfeng

1 town
 Yueping

References

www.xzqh.org 

 
County-level divisions of Hunan
Hengyang